The 2016–17 season will be Krško's 2nd season in the Slovenian PrvaLiga, Slovenian top division, since the league was created in 1991. Krško will compete in Slovenian PrvaLiga and Slovenian Football Cup.

Players
As of 3 July 2016.

Transfer

Pre-season and friendlies

Summer

Competitions

Overall

Overview
{| class="wikitable" style="text-align: center"
|-
!rowspan=2|Competition
!colspan=8|Record
|-
!
!
!
!
!
!
!
!
|-
| PrvaLiga

|-
| Cup

|-
! Total

PrvaLiga

League table

Results summary

Results by round

Matches

Cup

First round

Statistics

Squad statistics

Goalscorers

See also
2016–17 Slovenian PrvaLiga
2016–17 Slovenian Football Cup

References

External links
Official website 
Krsko on soccerway
NK Krško YouTube

Slovenian football clubs 2016–17 season